The Journal of Visualized Experiments (styled JoVE) is a peer-reviewed scientific journal that publishes experimental methods in video format. The journal is based in Cambridge, MA and was established in December 2006. Moshe Pritsker is the CEO and co-founder.

Abstracting and indexing 
JoVE is abstracted and indexed in Index Medicus, MEDLINE/PubMed, BIOSIS Previews, and Science Citation Index Expanded. According to the Journal Citation Reports, the journal had a 2020 impact factor of 1.4.

Format and scope 
JoVE covers research methods and experimental techniques from both the physical and life sciences. The journal currently has 13 sections: Biology, Developmental Biology, Neuroscience, Immunology and Infection, Medicine, Bioengineering, Engineering, Chemistry, Behavior, Environment, Biochemistry, Cancer Research, and Genetics. JoVE also publishes Science Education collections aimed at instructing scientists in fundamental concepts and methods in a range of fields including biology, chemistry, physics, psychology, and practical subjects like laboratory safety, cell culturing, and care of Drosophila flies.

Function in replication
Some experiments can be difficult to replicate if they involve techniques that are unfamiliar or unusually sensitive, and a short written description of the original scientific methods might not be sufficient. JoVE videos are a step-by-step visual guide of the actual experiment so that the minute hand movements and other subtle manipulations necessary to perform the experiment successfully can be seen.

Publication costs 
JoVE originally started as a full open access publication, but switched to a subscription model in 2009. As of 2021, the cost of video production by JoVE to accompany a published article is $1,400, (though authors can instead opt to produce their own videos). The journal has a hybrid open access option, with an additional article processing charge of $2,500.

References

External links 
 

English-language journals
Publications established in 2006
Multidisciplinary scientific journals
Monthly journals
Online-only journals